Aladefa is a surname. Notable people with the surname include:

Ayodele Aladefa (1970–2017), Nigerian long jumper
Kehinde Aladefa (born 1974), Nigerian hurdler
Taiwo Aladefa (born 1974), Nigerian hurdler, sister of Kehinde

Surnames of Nigerian origin